La Luna may refer to:
 The moon in Italian and Spanish
 La Luna (Portland, Oregon), a defunct Portland, Oregon nightclub
 La Luna (1979 film), a 1979 film by Italian director Bernardo Bertolucci
 La Luna (2011 film), a 2011 short film from Pixar

Music
 La Luna (Sarah Brightman album), a 2000 album by English soprano Sarah Brightman
 La Luna: Live in Concert, a 2001 Sarah Brightman concert inspired by that album
 La Luna (Holger Czukay album), a 2000 album by Holger Czukay
 "La Luna" (song), a 1989 song by Belinda Carlisle
 "La Luna", a song by Angelo Branduardi 
 "La Luna", a 1982 song by Nova
 "La Luna", a 2012 song by Reks from REBELutionary
 "La Luna", the band

See also
Luna (disambiguation)